Athletes from Trinidad and Tobago competed at the 1952 Summer Olympics in Helsinki, Finland.

Medalists

Bronze
 Rodney Wilkes — Weightlifting, Men's Featherweight
 Lennox Kilgour — Weightlifting, Men's Middle Heavyweight

References
Official Olympic Reports
International Olympic Committee results database

Nations at the 1952 Summer Olympics
1952 Summer Olympics
1952 in Trinidad and Tobago